Dennis Mark Prager (born August 2, 1948) is an American conservative radio talk show host and writer. He is the host of the nationally syndicated radio talk show The Dennis Prager Show. In 2009, he co-founded PragerU, which creates five-minute videos from an American conservative perspective.

His initial political work starting in 1969 concerned Refusenik, the Soviet Jews who were unable to emigrate. He gradually began offering more and broader commentary on politics. His views generally align with social conservatism.

Early life and education 
Dennis Prager was born in Brooklyn to Hilda Prager (1919–2009) and her husband, Max Prager (1918–2014). Prager and his sibling Kenneth Prager, were raised in a Modern Orthodox Jewish home. He attended the Yeshiva of Flatbush in Brooklyn, New York, where he befriended Joseph Telushkin.

He went to Brooklyn College and graduated with a  major in history and Middle Eastern Studies. Over the next few years he took courses at the Columbia University School of International and Public Affairs and at the University of Leeds; he then left academia without finishing a graduate degree. After he left graduate school, Prager left Modern Orthodoxy but maintained many traditional Jewish practices; he remained religious. Prager holds an honorary Doctor of Laws from Pepperdine University.

Career

Beginnings 

In 1969, while he was studying in England, he was recruited by a Jewish group to travel to the Soviet Union to interview Jews about their life there. When he returned the next year, he was in demand as a speaker on repression of Soviet Jews; he earned enough from lectures to travel, and visited around sixty countries. He became the national spokesman for the Student Struggle for Soviet Jewry.

The start of Prager's career overlapped with a growing tendency among American Jews, who had been staunchly liberal, to move toward the center and some to the right, driven in part by the influx of Jews from the Soviet Union. In 1975, Prager and Telushkin published an introduction to Judaism intended for nonobservant Jews: The Nine Questions People Ask About Judaism, which became a bestseller. Among the questions addressed in the text were: how does Judaism differ from Christianity, and can one doubt the existence of God and still be a good Jew, and how do you account for unethical but religious Jews?

Prager ran the Brandeis-Bardin Institute from 1976 to 1983; Telushkin worked with him there. It was Prager's first salaried job.  He soon earned a reputation as a moral critic attacking secularism and narcissism, both of which he said were destroying society; some people called him a Jewish Billy Graham.

1980s
In 1982, KABC (AM) in Los Angeles hired Prager to host its Sunday night religious talk show Religion on the Line, which got top ratings and eventually led to a weekday talk show. He and Telushkin published another book in 1983, Why the Jews?  The Reason for Antisemitism.

According to a review in Commentary, the book depicts anti-Semitism as a "sinister form of flattery"; the authors wrote that hatred of Jews arises from resentment over Jews' acceptance of the doctrine that they are God's chosen people, charged with bringing a moral message to the world. The book describes Jews as both a nation (stateless for a long time) and followers of a religion and says that this identity is essential to Judaism; the book says that calls for Jews to culturally assimilate as well as opposition to Zionism are both forms of antisemitism. The book describes secular Jews as people who have lost their way, and who generally fall into the error of applying Judaism's mission to reform the world in ways that tend to be leftist, totalitarian, and destructive.

He also wrote a syndicated column for newspapers across the country. In 1985, Prager launched his own quarterly journal, Ultimate Issues, which was renamed to The Prager Perspective in 1996.

In 1986, he divorced and underwent a year of therapy, which the Encyclopedia of Judaism says contributed to his 1999 book Happiness is a Serious Problem. In 1990, he wrote an essay called "Judaism, Homosexuality and Civilization" that argued against normalizing homosexuality in the Jewish community and placed sexual sins on a continuum from premarital sex, celibacy, adultery, homosexuality, bestiality, and incest; he argued that confining sex to heterosexual marriage desexualized religion, which was a great achievement of ancient Jewish tradition that was worth fighting to retain.

1990s
By 1992, he was remarried. By that time he was, according to the Los Angeles Jewish Journal, a "fixture on local radio" and "a Jewish St. George battling the forces of secularity on behalf of simple 'goodness'", and generally socially conservative, with some exceptions; he supported a woman's legal access to abortion (although he said it was usually immoral), and supported and justified sex between non-married consenting men and women. In 1992, he became involved with the Stephen S. Wise Temple and gave talks there, and got a weekday night talk show on KABC.

In 1994, Prager also did an hour each weekday, via satellite on WABC, KABC's sister station in New York, before doing his KABC show locally.

During the 1994–1995 television season, Multimedia Entertainment syndicated a television show featuring Prager. Prager said he was "ambivalent about television as a medium for deep, intelligent programming" but that the show was "an incredible opportunity to reach a mass audience with my belief system". In 1995, he moved the studio audience on-stage with him where they could interact with him more directly.

Political commentary

Prager supported Jimmy Carter in the 1976 US presidential election. In 1994, the Anti-Defamation League published a report on antisemitism in the Christian right movement; Prager, who aligned with the social and political conservatism of the Christian right, attacked the ADL and its report. In 1995, he urged conservative Jews to be open to working with conservative Christians, like the Christian Coalition. In 1995, he named Jacob Petuchowski, Eliezer Berkovits, Harold Kushner, C.S. Lewis, Richard John Neuhaus, Michael Novak, and George Gilder as the people who had influenced his theology the most.

In 1995, Prager criticized the Illinois Supreme Court decision in the Baby Richard case that removed a child from his adoptive parents. With KABC he held a "Rally for Baby Richard", where he got support from actors Priscilla Presley, Tom Selleck, and John McCook.

In 1996, Prager testified in Congress in favor of the Defense of Marriage Act. Prager testified that "the acceptance of homosexuality as the equal of heterosexual marital love signifies the decline of Western civilization." Prager worked with Bob Dole's campaign in the 1996 presidential election; when polls prior to the election showed that the Dole campaign did not have much Jewish support, Prager said this was because "American Jews are ignorant regarding the anti Israel aspects of the current Democrat Party."

Since 1999, he has hosted a nationally syndicated talk show on the socially and politically conservative Christian radio station KRLA in Los Angeles. KRLA is part of the Salem Media Group that carries other conservative hosts, including James Dobson, Randall Terry, Janet Parshall, Sebastian Gorka and Larry Elder; it is a key voice of the Christian right that seeks to change American politics as well as the way that individual people live.

In 2006, Prager criticized Keith Ellison, the first Muslim elected to Congress, for announcing that he would use the Quran for the reenactment of his swearing in ceremony. Prager wrote: "Insofar as a member of Congress taking an oath to serve America and uphold its values is concerned, America is interested in only one book, the Bible. If you are incapable of taking an oath on that book, don't serve in Congress." In response, former New York City Mayor Ed Koch called for Prager to end his service on the United States Holocaust Memorial Museum Council.

In 2009, Prager joined other Salem Radio Network hosts to oppose the Affordable Care Act. In 2014, while same-sex marriage in the United States was in the process of being nationally legalized, he wrote that if that were to happen, then "there is no plausible argument for denying polygamous relationships, or brothers and sisters, or parents and adult children, the right to marry." In 2014, he also said that the "heterosexual AIDS" crisis was something "entirely manufactured by the Left".

Prager endorsed Donald Trump in the 2016 presidential election, but said that Trump was his "17th choice out of 17 candidates". He clarified that he "was not a Trump supporter, when there was a choice" but added, "There is no choice now." Prager had previously said that Trump was "unfit to be a presidential candidate, let alone president". Conor Friedersdorf of The Atlantic criticized Prager for endorsing Trump.

In 2017, Prager was invited to be a guest conductor for the volunteer orchestra of Santa Monica, California, as part of a fundraising concert at the Walt Disney Concert Hall. Some of the orchestra members protested the invitation, which they considered promoting bigotry. The orchestra leader, Guido Lamell, had invited Prager because he admired him, as Prager often discussed and promoted classical music on his shows and had guest-conducted a few times in the past, and because he thought Prager's presence might help raise more money. Lamell called Prager "a great man, leader and friend".

In February 2020, he told a caller: "Of course you should never call anybody the n-word, that's despicable," but complained about the word itself being considered unacceptable. In April 2020, Prager called the COVID-19 lockdowns "the greatest mistake in the history of humanity." He was subsequently criticized in the media for trivializing the seriousness of the COVID-19 pandemic. In a 2020 video called "'Follow the Science' Is a LIE", Prager touted Sweden's response to COVID-19 and asserted, "Sweden is the proof that lockdowns are useless". A fact check found Prager's claim false, as Sweden had higher rates of COVID infection and mortality than other Scandinavian countries.

In a November 2021 Newsmax interview, Prager argued that "irrational fears" about people not vaccinated against COVID-19 had wrongly made them "the pariahs of America as I have not seen in my lifetime", more than gay men and intravenous drug users during the AIDS crisis, who he inaccurately said had not been ostracized. The Independent called his comments "alarming revisionism". In the interview, Prager also called concerns about climate change "idiotic" and "irrational".

PragerU 

In 2009, Prager and his producer Allen Estrin started a website called PragerU, which creates five-minute videos on various topics from a conservative perspective. BuzzFeed News described PragerU as "one of the biggest, most influential and yet least understood forces in online media."  it spent around 40% of its annual $10 million budget on marketing; each video is produced according to a consistent style.  Videos cover topics such as "racism, sexism, income inequality, gun ownership, Islam, immigration, Israel, police brutality" and speech on college campuses. BuzzFeed News wrote that "the biggest reason PragerU has escaped national attention is that it mostly doesn't do Trump," or engage with the political news cycle.  Some of its videos had viewer access restricted by YouTube in 2017.

Personal life 
Prager speaks English, French, Russian and Hebrew. His brother, Kenneth Prager, is a physician and professor at Columbia University Irving Medical Center. His nephew, Joshua Prager, is a former writer for The Wall Street Journal.

On October 18, 2021, Prager announced that he had tested positive for COVID-19 the previous week and had received ivermectin and Regeneron's monoclonal antibody treatment. He said he had been taking  hydroxychloroquine with zinc prophylactically "from the beginning", and that "natural immunity" from deliberately contracting COVID-19 was what he had "hoped for the entire time".

Bibliography 
Prager's columns are handled by Creators Syndicate. He has been published in The Wall Street Journal, the Los Angeles Times and  Commentary. His weekly syndicated column appears on such online websites as Townhall, National Review Online, Jewish World Review and elsewhere. He also writes a bi-weekly column for The Jewish Journal of Greater Los Angeles.

In 2018, he published a commentary on the Book of Exodus; this was followed by another commentary on the Book of Genesis in 2019. Both were published by the Salem Media Group.

 The Nine Questions People Ask About Judaism (with Joseph Telushkin) (1986) 
 Think a Second Time (44 Essays on 44 Subjects) (1996) 
 Happiness Is a Serious Problem: A Human Nature Repair Manual (1999) 
 Why the Jews? The Reason for Antisemitism (with Joseph Telushkin) (2003) 
 Still the Best Hope: Why the World Needs American Values to Triumph (2012) 
 The Ten Commandments: Still the Best Moral Code (2015) 
 The Ten Commandments: Still the Best Path to Follow (2015) (for children) 
 The Rational Bible: Exodus (2018) 
 The Rational Bible: Genesis (2019) 
 The Rational Passover Haggadah (2022) 
 The Rational Bible: Deuteronomy: God, Blessings, and Curses (2022)

Filmography 
 For Goodness Sake, 1993
 For Goodness Sake II, 1996
 Israel in a Time of Terror, 2002
 Baseball, Dennis, & the French, 2011
 No Safe Spaces, 2019

See also
 Judaism and politics

References

External links 

 
 
 

1948 births
Living people
20th-century American male writers
20th-century American non-fiction writers
21st-century American male writers
21st-century American non-fiction writers
Activists from California
American columnists
American conservative talk radio hosts
American male non-fiction writers
American political commentators
American political writers
American Zionists
American anti-communists
American anti-same-sex-marriage activists
Bible commentators
Brooklyn College alumni
Critics of atheism
Jewish activists
Jewish American writers
Jewish non-fiction writers
Male critics of feminism
Radio personalities from Los Angeles
School of International and Public Affairs, Columbia University alumni
The Daily Wire people
Writers from Brooklyn
Writers on antisemitism
Yeshiva of Flatbush alumni